William Fraser (died 1297) was a late 13th century Bishop of St Andrews and Guardian of the Kingdom of Scotland. Before election to the bishopric, he had been and Royal Chancellor of King Alexander III of Scotland and dean of Glasgow. He was elected to the bishopric on 4 August 1279, and confirmed in the position the following year by Pope Nicholas III

William was one of the leading political figures in the kingdom during the crisis that emerged in the aftermath of King Alexander. In 1290, he was elected as one of the six Guardians of Scotland, the six oligarchs who ran Scotland until the accession of King John Balliol. When the latter was appointed as King of Scots by King Edward I of England, William retained his role as one of the country's leading political  players. In 1295, William was sent to France as part of the king's attempt to gain an alliance with the King of the French. He remained in France for the remaining two years of his life, and died at Artuyl, on 20 August 1297. He was buried in the Church of the "Preaching Friars" on the Rue Saint-Jacques in Paris. His heart was returned to St Andrews, and was buried in the wall of the church by his successor, William de Lamberton.

References
Dowden, John, The Bishops of Scotland, ed. J. Maitland Thomson, (Glasgow, 1912)

1297 deaths
Bishops of St Andrews
13th-century Scottish Roman Catholic bishops
Guardians of Scotland
William Fraser
Year of birth unknown